Al Barkanyene (Tarifit: Ibarkanen, ⵉⴱⴰⵔⴽⴰⵏⴻⵏ; Arabic:  البركانيين) is a commune in the Nador Province of the Oriental administrative region of Morocco. At the time of the 2004 census, the commune had a total population of 1619 people living in 298 households.

References

Populated places in Nador Province
Rural communes of Oriental (Morocco)